The Flint Hills, historically known as Bluestem Pastures or Blue Stem Hills, are a region in eastern Kansas and north-central Oklahoma named for the abundant residual flint eroded from the bedrock that lies near or at the surface. It consists of a band of hills stretching from Kansas to Oklahoma, extending from Marshall and Washington Counties in the north to Cowley County, Kansas and Kay and Osage Counties in Oklahoma in the south, to Geary and Shawnee Counties west to east. Oklahomans generally refer to the same geologic formation as the Osage Hills or "the Osage."

The Flint Hills Ecoregion is designated as a distinct region because it has the densest coverage of intact tallgrass prairie in North America. Due to its rocky soil, the early settlers were unable to plow the area, resulting in the prevalence of cattle ranches as opposed to the crop land more typical of the Great Plains. These ranches rely on annual controlled burns conducted by ranchers every spring to renew the prairie grasses for cattle to graze.

The Flint Hills Discovery Center, a science and history museum focusing on the Flint Hills, opened in Manhattan, Kansas, in April 2012.

Description

 
Explorer Zebulon Pike first coined the name the Flint Hills in 1806 when he entered into his journal, "passed very ruff flint hills". The underlying bedrock of the hills is a flinty limestone. The largest town in the area is Manhattan, Kansas, and the hills can be accessed from the Flint Hills Scenic Byway, which passes through the region.

Geology
The rocks exposed in the Flint Hills were laid down about 250 million years ago during the Permian Period. During this time, much of the Midwest, including Kansas and Oklahoma, was covered with shallow seas. As a result, much of the Flint Hills is composed of limestone and shale, with plentiful fossils of prehistoric sea creatures. Numerous roadcuts of the Florence Member are prominent along Interstate 70 in Riley County, Kansas. Unlike the Pennsylvanian limestones to the east, however, many of the limestones in the Flint Hills contain several bands of chert or flint. Because chert is much less soluble than the limestone surrounding it, the weathering of the limestone has left behind a clay soil with abundant chert gravel. Most of the hilltops in the region are capped with this chert gravel.

The highest point in the Flint Hills is Butler County High Point, with an elevation of 1680 ft (512 m).

Environment 

Due to shallow outcroppings of limestone and chert that lay just underneath the soil surface, corn and wheat farming were not practical over much of the area since plowing the land wasn't feasible. For this reason, cattle ranching became the main agricultural activity in the region.

Never having been ploughed over and sparsely developed, the Flint Hills represent the last expanse of intact tallgrass prairie in the nation. They present the best opportunity for sustained preservation of this unique habitat that once covered the vast Great Plains. Most of the plains, such as the Central tall grasslands to the north, have better soil than the Flint Hills and a richer plant cover, but have almost entirely been converted to farmland.

Tallgrass prairie is renewed by fire and grazing, which also keeps back the growth of trees and shrubs. Prominent grass species are big bluestem (Andropogon gerardi), switchgrass (Panicum virgatum), and Indian grass (Sorghastrum nutans).

Animals native to the Flint Hills include the American bison, which once grazed the area by the millions and were almost entirely exterminated, but have now been reintroduced. The elk that once roamed the region are gone.

The United States Environmental Protection Agency and the World Wildlife Fund have designated the Flint Hills as an ecoregion, distinct from other grasslands of the Great Plains.

Four tallgrass prairie preserves are located in the Flint Hills. The largest of these, the Tallgrass Prairie Preserve, in the Osage Hills near Pawhuska, Oklahoma boasts a large population of bison and is an important refuge for other wildlife such as the greater prairie chicken (Tympanuchus cupido). The other preserves in Kansas, are the  Tallgrass Prairie National Preserve in northern Chase County near Strong City, the Flint Hills Tallgrass Prairie Preserve east of Cassoday, "the Prairie Chicken Capital of the World", and the Konza Prairie, which is managed as a tallgrass prairie biological research station by Kansas State University and is located near Manhattan.

In popular culture 
 William Least Heat-Moon wrote a tribute to the Flint Hills and the Kansans who live there in his book PrairyErth.

See also
Jacobs Creek flood
List of ecoregions in the United States (WWF)
 List of protected grasslands of North America

References

External links

 Flint Hills Regional Council
 Flint Hills resources
 Flint Hills publications at KGI Online Library State Library of Kansas
Maps
 Flint Hills Map (pdf) - Kansas Geological Survey (University of Kansas)
 Flint Hills Map (pdf) - Flint Hills Discovery Center
Photos
 National Geographic photo gallery

Grasslands of the North American Great Plains
Temperate grasslands, savannas, and shrublands in the United States
Ecoregions of the United States
 
Geology of Kansas
Landforms of Kansas
Regions of Kansas
Geographic regions of Oklahoma
Hills of Kansas
Grasslands of Oklahoma